General of the Cavalry was a General of the branch OF8-rank in the Imperial Army, the interwar Reichswehr, and the Wehrmacht. It was the second-highest General officer rank below Generaloberst. Artillery officers of equivalent rank were called General der Artillerie, and infantry officers of equivalent rank General der Infanterie.  The Wehrmacht also created General der Panzertruppen (tank troops), General der Gebirgstruppen (mountain troops), General der Pioniere (engineers), General der Flieger (aviators), General der Fallschirmtruppen (parachute troops), and General der Nachrichtentruppen (communications troops)

List of officers who were General der Kavallerie

B 

 Friedrich von Bernhardi (1849–1930)
 Moritz von Bissing (1844–1917)
 Walter Braemer (1883–1955)

C 
 Friedrich August Peter von Colomb (1775–1854)

D 
 Georg Graf von der Decken (1787–1859)
 Adolf von Deines (1845-1911)

E 
 Karl von Einem (1853–1934) 
 Rudolf Koch-Erpach (1886–1971)
 Franz Hermann Günther von Etzel (1862–1948)

F 
 Max von Fabeck (1854–1916)
 Hans Feige (1880–1953)
 Kurt Feldt (1897–1970)
 Rudolf von Frommel (1857–1921)

G 
 Otto von Garnier (1859–1947)
 Ludwig Freiherr von Gebsattel (1857–1930)

H 

 Gottlieb Graf von Haeseler (1836–1919)
 Erick-Oskar Hansen (1889–1967)
 Gustav Harteneck (1892–1984)
 Philipp von Hellingrath (1862–1939)
 Erich Hoepner (1886–1944)
 Ernst von Hoeppner (1860–1922)
 Leonhard von Hohenhausen (1788–1872)
 Gustav von Hollen (1851–1917)

K 
 Alfred von Kühne (1853-1945)
Philipp Kleffel (1887–1964)
 Paul Ludwig Ewald von Kleist (1881-1954)
 Rudolf Koch-Erpach (1886–1971) 
 Carl-Erik Koehler (1895–1958)
 Ernst August Köstring (1876–1953)
 Otto Kreß von Kressenstein (1850–1929)
 Karl Wilhelm Heinrich von Kleist (1836-1917)
 Gebhard Friedrich von Krosigk (1835-1904)

L 
 Maximilian von Laffert (1855–1917)
 Georg Lindemann (1884–1963)

M 

 August von Mackensen (1849–1945)
 Eberhard von Mackensen (1889–1969) 
 Georg von der Marwitz (1856–1929)

P 
 Curt von Pfuel (1849–1936)
 Ernst Ludwig von Pfuel (1716−1798)
 Wilhelm Malte II of Putbus (1833–1907)
 Georg Adam von Pfuel (1618–1672)
 Prince Friedrich Leopold of Prussia (1865–1931)

R 
 Alfred Bonaventura von Rauch (1824–1900)
Friedrich von Rauch (1855–1935)
Gustav Waldemar von Rauch (1819–1890)
Manfred Freiherr von Richthofen (1855–1939)
 Edwin Graf von Rothkirch und Trach (1888–1980)

S 
 Maximilian von Speidel (1856–1943)
 Leo Geyr von Schweppenburg (1886-1974)

U 
 Wilhelm Karl, Duke of Urach

W 
 Alfred von Waldersee (1832–1904) 
 Hermann Ludwig von Wartensleben (1826–1921)
 Maximilian von Weichs (1881–1954) (Later promoted to Generalfeldmarschall)
 Siegfried Westphal (1902–1982)

Z 
 Christian von Zweibrücken (1782–1859)

See also
General (Germany)
Comparative officer ranks of World War II

References

Three-star officers
Military ranks of Germany
Three-star officers of Nazi Germany
Lists of generals